Ashour Hamed Bourashed was a member of the Libyan National Transitional Council representing the city of Derna.

References

Living people
Members of the National Transitional Council
Ambassadors of Libya to the Arab League
Year of birth missing (living people)